This is the progression of world record improvements of the long jump W80 division of Masters athletics.

Key

References

 Masters Athletics Long Jump list

Masters athletics world record progressions
Long